Leo Gale "Bud" Hake (July 11, 1927 – March 23, 1994) was an American football coach. Hake was the head coach at Grays Harbor College in Aberdeen, Washington from 1967 to 1976.

Hake died at age 66 of amyotrophic lateral sclerosis in 1994, and was buried in Aberdeen.

Head coaching record

College

References

External links
 

1927 births
1994 deaths
American football tackles
Central Washington Wildcats football players
Grays Harbor Chokers football coaches
Idaho State Bengals football coaches
High school football coaches in Washington (state)
Sportspeople from Yakima, Washington
People from Kittitas County, Washington
Coaches of American football from Washington (state)
Players of American football from Washington (state)
Deaths from motor neuron disease
Neurological disease deaths in Washington (state)